Victoria Bay is a small cove in the Western Cape, South Africa.  It is situated on the Garden Route between George and Wilderness. It is a popular beach for surfers, consisting of a right hand reef-like wave which rolls over small boulder-like rocks for about 200m. District and National surf competitions are often held at Vic Bay and despite its small size, Vic Bay is a well-known and much-visited spot.

The western side of the bay culminates in large boulders believed to have rolled down from the top of the hill. This area is known as Land's End, the name given to the original bungalow at the end of the then-dirt road. The Land's End bungalow is now a large self-catering and B&B property, as are most of the thirteen properties along the road. 

The eastern side of the bay consists of rocks, flanked briefly by a concrete wall built to prevent erosion of the slope. There is a small cave often used by fishermen as shelter. The end of the eastern side is known as Kabeljou Bank, named after the large Cob which are often line-caught from the rocks.

A number of camp sites overlook the bay and clusters of holiday chalets are situated nearby, making it a popular holiday destination during the summer and Easter holiday periods. The grassy area above the beach has braai facilities and a small shop and restaurant are situated at the top of the beach road. 

Running above the Bay is the railway line joining George, Wilderness, Sedgefield and ultimately Knysna. The famous Outeniqua Choo Tjoe operated popular tourist rides along this route, although following operational difficulties and severe damage to the tracks above Vic Bay during the 2006 storms, its future remains uncertain.

A concrete jetty, flanked by a sandy-bottomed rock pool, looks out across the bay and is a popular place for watching the surfers and for fishing. The original jetty, given to the bay by the original owner of what is now The Waves B&B, was severely damaged during storms and was replaced by a larger one during the early 1990s.

Notable people  
 Bianca Buitendag, professional surfer

Populated places in the George Local Municipality
Surfing locations in South Africa